Martine Clémenceau (born 18 March 1949) is a French singer.

She won the Yamaha Music Festival in 1971 with the song A jour l’amour. Then, she represented France in the Eurovision Song Contest in 1973 with Sans toi, taking the 15th place.

Her song Solitaire, written in 1981 is her most important hit in France, and Laura Branigan in 1983 recorded a cover that was #7 Billboard Hot 100 hit in the US, and #8 in Canada.

She sang Quelquefois as a duet with Claude François and during the 1990s.  She wrote songs especially for Herbert Léonard. In 2005 she received the René Jeanne Prize.

References

External links
A brief biography 
France in the Eurovision Song Contest 1973 
Martine Clémenceau at Myspace.com
 
 

French women singers
Eurovision Song Contest entrants for France
Eurovision Song Contest entrants of 1973
Winners of Yamaha Music Festival
Living people
1949 births